Women have served in the Canadian House of Commons since the 1921 entrance of Agnes MacPhail, a member of the Progressive Party of Canada from Grey Southeast. Over 370 women have since served in the House.  there are 103 female MPs, or 30% of the body, the highest in Canada's history. Twenty-two of them were elected in the 2021 federal election. This represents a gain of three seats from the previous record of 100 women in the 43rd Canadian Parliament, of whom 98 were elected in the 2019 federal election, followed by two more at subsequent by-elections in 2020.

Women have been elected to the House of Commons from every province and territory in Canada.

House of Commons

First elected before 1993

First elected 1993–2008

First elected since 2011

Proportion of women in the House 
Numbers and proportions are as they were directly after the relevant election and do not take into account by-elections, defections, or other changes in membership. Instead, women who were initially by-elected to their seats and later successful in holding them at a subsequent federal election are counted as having won the latter to serve full terms, if completed. "Others" include the Reform Party between 1988 and 1997, the Canadian Alliance only in 2000, Bloc Québécois since 1993, and the Greens since 2011.

References 

Parliamentarians
Parliament
Lists of Members of the House of Commons of Canada
Canada, Parliament